The Land of Israel Gaonate (Hebrew: ישיבת ארץ ישראל‎, romanized: Yeshivat Eretz Israel) was the chief talmudical academy and central legalistic body of the Jewish community in Palestine during the middle of the ninth century, or even earlier, till its demise during the 11th-century. During its existence, it competed with the
Babylonian Gaonate for the support of the growing diasporic communities. The Egyptian and German Jews particularly regarded the Palestinian geonim as their spiritual leaders. The history of the gaonate was revealed in documents discovered in the Cairo genizah in 1896. Sparse information is available on the Palestinian geonim prior to the middle of the ninth century. The extant material consists essentially of a list in Seder Olam Zuta relating all the geonim to Mar Zutra.

In the middle of the ninth century, the Palestinian academy was transferred from Tiberias to Jerusalem. It was forced to move to Tyre, Lebanon in 1071; authority was later transferred to Fostat, Egypt. The Academy of Palestine had probably ceased to exist before Palestine was conquered by the Christians, but the tradition of the Palestinian gaonate seems to have survived at Damascus, for Benjamin of Tudela (c. 1170) says that the teachers of Damascus were considered as the "scholastic heads of the Land of Israel."

The Gaonate in The Land of Israel
Prior to the middle of the 9th-century, information about the geonim of Palestine is listed in Seder Olam Zuta which links all the geonim to Mar Zutra (and thereby to the Davidic line). But fragments found in the geniza contradict the list, claiming that a member of the priestly family headed the academy in Tiberias in the middle of the 8th-century. Evidence of the academy in Palestine existing during the lifetime of Hai Gaon, the last Babylonian gaon, is from a mention of Josiah the ḥaber being ordained at the "holy yeshiva of Palestine" in a document dated 1031. A postscript to a small chronicle dating from the year 1046 says that Solomon ben Judah was then the "head of the Academy of Jerusalem". Three generations of the descendants of this Solomon ben Judah predecessor, Solomon HaKohen ben Joseph, were heads of the Palestinian academy, and bore the title of "gaon." Solomon HaKohen ben Joseph reigned for approximately six months during the year 1025. A work of one of these geonim of Palestine, the Megillat Abiathar, which was discovered by Schechter in the genizah of Cairo, and gives a very clear account of this interesting episode in the history of the Jews of Palestine.

During the 11th-century, daily prayers were offered at the Cave of Machpela for the welfare for the head of the Gaonate.

Hierarchy of the academy
The hierarchy of the academy in The Land of Israel was similar to that of Babylonia, although it had become a dynastic institution. The three main positions were controlled by three families, two of which claimed priestly descent. The av beit din, the president of the court, ranked next to the gaon, and that another member of the college, called "the third" ("ha-shelishi"), held the third highest office.  A letter in the "Mittheilungen aus der Sammlung der Papyrus Erzherzog Rainer" is addressed to Solomon b. Judah, "the first gaon of Palestine". This letter clearly shows the same close connection between the Jews of Egypt and those of Palestine as is indicated in the Megillat Abiathar. Solomon ben Judah was succeeded at his death by Daniel ben Azariah, a scion of the house of exilarchs who had gone from Babylon to Palestine, and had formerly done much injury to the brothers Joseph and Elijah HaKohen ben Solomon Gaon, was elected gaon, to the exclusion of Joseph, who remained av beit din. Joseph died in 1053 and his brother Elijah became "Av Beit din". Daniel ben Azariah died in 1062 after a long and serious illness, which he himself is said to have acknowledged to be a punishment for his ill treatment of his predecessors. Elijah now became gaon, filling the office down to 1084.

Exile and contested authority
After Jerusalem was taken by the Seljuq Turks in 1071, the gaonate was removed from Jerusalem, apparently to Tyre. In 1082 Elijah Gaon of Palestine called a large convocation at Tyre, and on this occasion he designated his son Abiathar as his successor in the gaonate, and his other son, Solomon, as av beit din. In 1084, Elijah held a council at Haifa. He died shortly thereafter and was buried in Galilee, near the old tannaic tombs, a large concourse of people attending the burial. Shortly after Abiathar entered upon his office, David ben Daniel, a descendant of the Babylonian exilarchs, was proclaimed exilarch in Egypt. David ben Daniel succeeded in having his authority recognized also by the communities along the Palestinian and Phoenician coasts, Tyre alone retaining its independence for a time. But when this city again came under Egyptian rule in 1089, the Egyptian exilarch subjected its community also, forcing Abiathar to leave the academy. The academy itself, however, resisted the exilarch, declaring his claims to be invalid, and pointing out his godlessness and tyranny while in office. Fast-day services were held (1093), and the sway of the Egyptian exilarch was soon ended. The nagid Meborak, to whom David ben Daniel owed his elevation, called a large assembly, which deposed David ben Daniel and reinstated Abiathar as gaon (Iyar, 1094). Abiathar wrote his Megillah in commemoration of this event.

A few years later, at the time of the First Crusade, Abiathar sent a letter to the community of Constantinople. It is dated from Tripolis in Phoenicia, to which the academy may have been removed. Abiathar was succeeded by his brother Solomon. An undated anonymous letter dwells on the controversies and difficulties with which the academy had to contend.

Transfer to Egypt
The next generation of Solomon HaKohen ben Joseph's descendants dwelt in Egypt. In 1031 Maṣliaḥ, a son of Solomon ben Elijah, addressed from the "gate of the Academy of Fostat" a letter to a certain Abraham, in which he gives his whole genealogy, adding the full title of "gaon, rosh yeshivat geon Yakov," to the names of his father, grandfather, and great-grandfather. The Academy of Palestine had probably ceased to exist before Palestine was conquered by the Christians, and its head, the gaon Maṣliaḥ, went to Fostat, where there was an academy that had seceded from the authority of the Palestinian academy at the time of the Egyptian exilarch David ben Daniel. It is not known what office Maṣliaḥ occupied at Fostat, although he retained his title of gaon. A daughter of Maṣliaḥ presented to the academy a book by Samuel ben Ḥofni which she had inherited from her grandfather, the gaon Solomon ben Elijah. In 1112 the Mushtamil, the philological work of the Karaite scholar Abu al-Faraj Harun, was copied for Elijah, a son of the gaon Abiathar, "grandson of a gaon and great-grandson of a gaon". In 1111 the same Elijah purchased at Fostat Rabbeinu Hananel's commentary to Joshua, which subsequently fell into the hands of his cousin, the gaon Maṣliaḥ. It may be noted here that the geonic family of Palestine was of Aaronite origin and that Abiathar claimed Ezra as his ancestor.

See also
 Palestinian minhag
 Sanhedrin
 Talmudic Academies in the Land of Israel
 Talmudic Academies in Babylonia

References

 
Jews in the Land of Israel
History of Palestine (region)